Dixon Fold railway station was built on the Manchester and Bolton Railway, between Clifton Junction railway station (Manchester to Preston Line) and Kearsley railway station, in Clifton near Pendlebury.  It opened in 1841. Maps of the area from 1848 give it the name Clifton Station, which should not to be confused with the nearby Clifton railway station on Rake Lane (formerly named Clifton Junction railway station), which opened in 1847.  The station closed between 2 August 1926 and 7 March 1927, but was closed permanently on 18 May 1931. The station was demolished after closure.

See also
 Wet Earth Colliery

References

Bibliography

External links
Site of Dixon Fold Station on navigable 1948 O.S. map

Disused railway stations in Salford
Former Lancashire and Yorkshire Railway stations
Railway stations in Great Britain opened in 1841
Railway stations in Great Britain closed in 1926
Railway stations in Great Britain opened in 1927
Railway stations in Great Britain closed in 1931